Legris is a surname. Notable people with the surname include:

 Claude Legris (born 1956), Canadian ice hockey player
 Jonathan Legris (born 1987), British racing driver
 Joseph-Hormisdas Legris (1850-1932), Canadian politician
 Manuel Legris (born 1964), French ballet dancer
 Roger Legris (1898-1981), French actor
 Sylvia Legris (born 1960), Canadian poet